Olema may refer to:
Olema, California, an unincorporated community in the United States
Olema, Washington, an unincorporated community in the United States
Olema, Russia, a rural locality (a selo) in Leshukonsky District of Arkhangelsk Oblast, Russia
Olema Station, California, a former name of Point Reyes Station, California
Olema Valley